Dembelia Sikunia is a chiefdom in Koinadugu District of Sierra Leone with a population of 14,552. Its principal town is Sikunia.

References

Chiefdoms of Sierra Leone
Northern Province, Sierra Leone